R. Erdem Erkul is founder and chairman of Cerebrum Tech and vice president at the Council of European Professional Informatics Societies. He was a public sector and investment director at Microsoft Turkey between 2018-2020 .  He was also vice president and executive board member at Informatics Association of Turkey between 2011-2015. He has worked at Samsung Electronics Turkey as Director of Public Sector and External Affairs between 2014-2018. He was also the spokesperson of Samsung Electronics Turkey during these years. He is known for his work on e- government, New Public Administration, informatics, entrepreneurship and social media.

Erkul received his PhD degree from Ankara University Faculty of Political Sciences, Department of Political Science and Public Administration. He completed his education before his PhD in Hacettepe University Political Science and Public Administration Department and Massachusetts University Political Science and Public Administration Department]. In 2008, he has conducted research at National Center for Digital Government which was established at Harvard University with Prof. Jane Fountain as a doctoral research fellow. In June 2013, he was awarded a certificate of completion for Innovation for Economic Development Executive Program Program in Harvard University, John F. Kennedy School of Government.

In 2005, he established first web portal (www.digital-government.net ) on e-government and informatics of the world. He is also current editor of this portal. He has worked as the coordinator in the Total Quality and Strategic Planning activities of the Hacettepe University in 2005-2006. In 2008, he established a new international e-government portal digital-government.net. He was Chair of Organizing Committee of GovCamp Turkey in 2011.

Erkul has worked with several NGOs. He was elected as the Vice President of Council of European Professional Informatics Societies in Brussels in November 2014. Since January 2010, he has been representing Informatics Association of Turkey in Council of European Professional Informatics Societies in Brussels.

He worked as public affairs lead of Microsoft Turkey between 2010-2013. After this role, Dr. Erkul has worked as Regional National Plan Director at Microsoft Middle East & Africa Headquarters in 2013-2014.

Erkul is executive committee member of Turkish Informatics Foundation.

He made TED talks about the technological developments in Turkey and the social transformation that revealed with these developments  in Turkish society.

He has completed Technological Disruption: Managing the Impact on Business, Society and Politics program at London School of Economics and Political Science.

Erkul, who puts a great emphasis on music in his life, plays kopuz, bağlama and piano.

Selected works
 Book Chapter. Use of Social Media in Government, 2012. Editor: Mete Yildiz
 Usability of Social Media in Public Services and Politics
 Aydin, M. D., Yildiz, M. and Erkul, E. (2012), "CCTV Surveillance and Ethics: Theory and Practice in the West and The MOBESE Case of Turkey", in Robinson, S. and Arslan, M. (eds.), Business Ethics: Contemporary Global and Regional Issues, Saarbrücken: Lambert Academic Publishing, pp. 55–76.
 Web 2.0 in the Process of e-participation: the Case of Organizing for America and the Obama Administration. NCDG Working paper #09-001. 2009, with Aysu Kes ERKUL.

References

External links 
 Erdem Erkul's personal website
 ePractise Portal
 National Center for Digital Government 
 Informatics Association of Turkey
 www.digitaldevlet.net
 www.digital-government.net

Turkish computer scientists
Living people
Ankara University Faculty of Political Sciences alumni
Hacettepe University alumni
Year of birth missing (living people)